The 2010 Rally Isle of Man was held between July 8–10, 2010. It was the 47th Rally Isle of Man, the fourth round of the 2010 MSA British Rally Championship and the fifth round of the 2010 MSA British Historic Rally Championship.

Results

Special stages

Final Classification

2010 British Rally Championship Drivers' championship (after 4 rounds of 6)

Sources

External links
Rally Isle of Man official website

2010
2010 British Rally Championship season
Rally